K-CASH is an electronic money system established by 'Korea Financial Telecommunication and Clearings Institute'.

K-CASH card is easily obtained from issuing bank. Several banks are issuing K-CASH card, including two credit card companies as of 2011. Users can load or unload value from their own account at bank counter, store, ATMs and online. Unlike other market dominant "transport cards", unloading K-CASH value to owner's account is done real-time, as a law only permits real-time transaction to electronic money, not to prepaid card.

South Korean Army, and Chuncheon, Hoengseong, Wonju buses adopt K-CASH as a major payment system. At first, K-CASH was mainly promoted as electronic fare collection system. Despite its advantage, such as bank guarantees its payment or real-time transaction, market dominant systems like T-money or Mybi/Cashbee system drive it out of the market. As of November 2011, following cities and railroad systems are using K-CASH as their public transport fare collecting system.

Card issuers 
 Citibank Korea (discontinued)
 Daegu Bank: Andong (discontinued)
 Hana Bank: Chuncheon, Wonju (discontinued)
 Industrial Bank of Korea (discontinued)
 Kookmin Bank/Kookmin Card (discontinued)
 Samsung Card (discontinued)
 Standard Chartered Korea: Chuncheon, Hoengseong, Wonju
 Shinhan Bank/Shinhan Card: all branches (discontinued)
 Woori Bank: all branches, including Kaesong Industrial Zone (discontinued)

References

External links 
 Korean Official homepage
 English KFTC homepage

Contactless smart cards
Fare collection systems in South Korea
Financial services companies of South Korea
Payment systems